Johnny Dang is a Vietnamese American jeweler based in Houston, Texas, who is known for his custom grills and involvement in the American hip-hop scene. He is a founder of Johnny Dang and Co.

Biography
Dang was born Đặng Anh Tuấn in the Đắk Lắk Province of Vietnam near the end of the Vietnam War. Dang's grandfather and father both worked in the jewelry trade. In 1987, Dang's father left Vietnam and emigrated to the United States. In 1996, Dang and his family followed his father to Houston, and Dang began working in jewelry repair.

Dang was working at a local flea market when he met rapper Paul Wall. Wall was impressed by Dang's technique of making grills, and the two went into business together in 2002. In 2016, Dang moved his business from the Sharpstown Mall to a stand-alone location.

In 2021, Dang broke off his business relationship with Vietnamese YouTuber  after the price of their mutually held cryptocurrency dropped.

In popular culture
Dang has been referenced in musical recordings by Migos, Gucci Mane, Lil Pump, Keith Ape, and Chief Keef, among others. 

He has appeared in music videos including “Gucci Bandanna” by Soulja Boy, Gucci Mane, and Shawty Low, "Grillz" by Nelly, "Wild Boy" by Machine Gun Kelly, "No Angel" by Beyoncé, "We Takin' Over" by DJ Khaled, "And I Still" by Rod Wave, "Ice Tray" by Quavo and Lil Yachty, and "Ice Cream Paint Job" by Dorrough. 

Dang himself has provided vocals for songs, such as on "Stay Iced Up" off Paul Wall's album Heart of a Champion.

References

Further reading

Living people
American jewellers
Vietnamese emigrants to the United States
People from Đắk Lắk Province
Businesspeople from Houston
Year of birth missing (living people)